Tall Armeni (also Romanized as Tall Ārmenī and Tall Ārmanī) is a village in Vardasht Rural District, in the Central District of Semirom County, Isfahan Province, Iran. At the 2006 census, its population was 27, in 8 families.

References 

Populated places in Semirom County